The 2008 La Flèche Wallonne cycling race took place on April 23, 2008 and was won by Luxembourger Kim Kirchen of . It was the 72nd running of the La Flèche Wallonne and covered  between Charleroi and Huy in Belgium in 4 hours, 35 minutes and 20 seconds.

Results

External links

2008 in road cycling
2008